Caroline Mavis Caddy (born 20 January 1944) is an Australian poet.

Biography

Born in Western Australia to an Australian mother and an American father, Caroline Mavis Caddy spent part of her childhood in the United States and Japan. She returned to Western Australia where she finished high school, and later worked as a dental nurse with the Road Dental Unit. According to Queensland poet Jaya Savige "Caddy writes with equal verve about the rural southwest of WA and her time abroad, particularly in China (though also Canada and Antarctica). ...Her relaxed, often conversational tone belies her sharp eye for detail which, combined with a knack for simile and metaphor, has remained acute throughout her career."

Awards
 1990 – Western Australian Week Literary Award for poetry
 1991 – National Book Council Banjo Award for Poetry
 1992 – National Book Council Award for Poetry
 2008 – Wesley Michel Wright Prize

Bibliography
 Singing at Night (1980)
 Letters From the North (1985)
 Beach Plastic (1989)
 Conquistadors (1991)
 Antarctica (1996)
 Working Temple (1996)
 Editing the Moon (1999)
 Esperance: New and Selected Poems (2007)
 Burning Bright (2010)

References

External links
 The Keeper and the Grove poem from Esperance
 'Place, Palimpsest and the Present Day: Gondwana in Caroline Caddy’s Antarctica' by Rosalind McFarlane, Cordite Poetry Review

1944 births
Living people
Australian people of American descent
Australian women poets
Writers from Western Australia